Sapporo Maruyama Baseball Stadium (札幌市円山球場), is a  baseball stadium in Sapporo, Hokkaidō, Japan.  The stadium holds 25,000 people, was built in 1934 and is currently used for high-school and amateur baseball games.

It is located at the Maruyama Sports complex, next to the Sapporo Maruyama Athletics Stadium, going uphill within the Maruyama Park.

External links
Stadium information

Baseball venues in Japan
Sports venues in Sapporo
Chūō-ku, Sapporo